Christine Werner (born 26 August 1954 in Vienna) is an Austrian writer. She is the author of dramas, literary cabaret, radio plays, net art, photographic art, poetry and narrative prose.

Biography
Christine Werner was born in 1954 in Vienna, Austria; today she is living in Vienna and Styria. In her own words, she is an author, an action artist and an artist for the Net.

She is a playwright, and she writes literary cabaret, poetry, radio plays, short stories and novels. Christine Werner is a member of the Austrian authors' associations Grazer Autorenversammlung (GAV), Literary Circle of Linz and ÖDA (Austrian Authors writing in Dialect). She received several subsidies for literature from the Austrian government and presented her texts to the public in Austria and Germany.

Awards and Literary Prizes
1996 Literary Contest Vienna
1997 Luitpold Stern Prize
1997 Subsidy for Playwrights by the Austrian government
1997 GEDOK Award Wiesbaden
1998 Travel Subsidy for Literature by the Austrian government

Works
Meine Schuhe eingraben, poetry, Publisher G. Grasl, Baden bei Wien 1996
Eine Handbreit über dem Knie, novel, Resistenz Verlag, Linz/Vienna 1999
Wien ist nicht Chicago, novel, Resistenz Verlag, Linz/Vienna 2000
fern & weh, Ein Reisefieber, short stories, Sisyphus Verlag, Vienna 2002
Eine Handvoll Himbeeren, radio play, Austrian Radio Ö1, Vienna 2002
Verdammt, novella, Arovell Verlag, Gosau 2008

References

External links
Official author's website
Author's entry at GAV
Book review (in German) about Wien ist nicht Chicago, by the Viennese Literaturhaus
Arovell Verlag (publisher)
Resistenz Verlag (publisher)
German story , printed in the literary magazine Schreibkraft.

Austrian women writers
1954 births
Living people